Southern Star is the twelfth studio album by American country music band Alabama, released in 1989. The album produced four singles, "Song of the South", "High Cotton", the title track and "If I Had You", all of which reached No. 1 on the Hot Country Singles charts between 1989 and 1990. It also reached No. 68 on the Billboard 200.

Track listing

Note: Tracks 6, 7, 11, and 13 were not added to the cassette version.

Personnel

Alabama
 Jeff Cook – fiddle, electric guitar, background vocals, lead vocals on "Barefootin'" and "Dixie Fire"
 Teddy Gentry – bass guitar, background vocals, lead vocals on "I Showed Her", co-lead vocals on "The Borderline"
 Mark Herndon – drums
 Randy Owen – electric guitar, lead vocals

Additional Musicians
 Eddie Bayers – drums
 Barry Beckett – piano
 David Briggs – piano, synthesizer
 Larry Byrom – acoustic guitar
 Steve Cash – harmonica
 Mark Casstevens – acoustic guitar
 Steve Cropper – electric guitar
 Charlie Daniels – co-lead vocals on "The Borderline"
 Costo Davis – keyboards, organ, synthesizer
 Jimmie Fadden – harmonica, jew's harp
 Steve Gibson – acoustic guitar, electric guitar
 Owen Hale – drums
 Larry Hanson – electric guitar
 Craig Krampf – percussion
 Mike Lawler – synthesizer
 Bernie Leadon – banjo, acoustic guitar, mandolin
 Josh Leo – electric guitar
 Carl Marsh – Fairlight
 Farrell Morris – percussion 
 Mark O'Connor – fiddle
 Larry Paxton – bass guitar
 Michael Rhodes – bass guitar
 Brent Rowan – acoustic guitar
 Biff Watson – synthesizer
 Reggie Young – electric guitar

Chart performance

Weekly charts

Year-end charts

Singles

Certifications

References

1989 albums
RCA Records albums
Alabama (American band) albums
Albums produced by Josh Leo
Albums produced by Barry Beckett